Hurricane #1 is the debut studio album by the British rock band Hurricane #1, released in 1997. It charted at number 11 in the UK album charts, and number eight in Scotland when compilations are disregarded (the album made No.17 with the compilations listed). The album was recorded at Lincoln's Chapel with producer Stephen Harris. The album was released in the US on 28 October 1997. The album eventually sold 100,000 copies.

Reception

Q magazine named it one of the best albums of 1997.

Track listing
All songs written by Andy Bell.

  "Just Another Illusion" - 5:40
  "Faces in a Dream" - 4:44
  "Step into My World" - 5:01
  "Mother Superior" - 5:11
  "Let Go of the Dream" - 2:38
  "Chain Reaction" - 3:41
  "Lucky Man" - 5:15
  "Strange Meeting" - 4:06
  "Monday Afternoon" - 3:03
  "Stand in Line" - 8:28

US bonus tracks
  "Touchdown"  - 4:40
  "Smoke Rings" - 8:35

Personnel
Personnel per booklet.

Hurricane No. 1
Alex Lowe –  vocals, guitar
Andy Bell –  lead guitar, keyboards, backing vocals
Will Pepper –  bass guitar
Gareth Farmer –  drums, percussion

Additional musicians
 Charlie Francis – strings arranger
 Chopper Harris – additional keyboards
 Idha – backing vocals (track 7)

Production and design
 Stephen Harris – producer, engineer, mixing
 Andy Bell – producer
 Naoki Tsuruta – front cover photography
 Paul Kelly – inside photography
 Phantom – design

References
 Citations

Sources

External links 

Hurricane No. 1 at YouTube (streamed copy where licensed)

1997 debut albums
Hurricane No. 1 albums
Creation Records albums